Fletcher Island is a Baffin Island offshore island located in the Arctic Archipelago in the territory of Nunavut. The island lies in Frobisher Bay, north of Newell Sound. The Hall Peninsula is to the east. Islands in the immediate vicinity include: Field Island to the east; Bruce Island to the northeast; Pike and Pugh Islands to the west.

References 

Uninhabited islands of Qikiqtaaluk Region
Islands of Baffin Island
Islands of Frobisher Bay